This is a list of sports venues in Saudi Arabia:

Riyadh 
King Fahd International Stadium, Opened 1987, Capacity 75,000.
Prince Faisal bin Fahd Stadium, Opened 1971, Capacity 30,000.

Jeddah 
King Abdullah Sports City, Opened  2014, Capacity 62,345.
Prince Abdullah al-Faisal Stadium,  Opened 1970, Capacity 25,000.
Prince Sultan bin Fahd Stadium,  Opened 1987, Capacity 15,000.

Others 
Department of Education Stadium (Unaizah)  Opened 1 March 1987, Capacity 10,000.
King Abdul Aziz Stadium in Mecca, Opened 1986, Capacity 17,000.
King Fahd Stadium, Taif  Opened ?, Capacity 20,000.
Prince Abdul Aziz bin Musa'ed Stadium  Opened ?, Capacity 20,000.
Prince Mohamed bin Fahd Stadium  Opened ?, Capacity 35,000.
Prince Mohammed bin Abdul Aziz Stadium  Opened ?, Capacity 20,000.
Prince Saud bin Jalawi Stadium  Opened 1982, Capacity 20,000.
Prince Sultan bin Abdul Aziz Stadium  Opened ?, Capacity 20,000.

 
 
Saudi Arabia
Venues
Sports venues